Pierre Maddaloni (born 23 June 1941) is a French rower. He competed in the men's eight event at the 1964 Summer Olympics.

References

External links
 

1941 births
Living people
French male rowers
Olympic rowers of France
Rowers at the 1964 Summer Olympics
Place of birth missing (living people)
World Rowing Championships medalists for France